Rude may refer to:

 Rudeness, disrespect for and failure to behave within the context of a society or a group of people's social laws or etiquette
 Rude (surname)
 Big Rude Jake (also known as Mr. Rude, born A. Jake Hiebert), a Canadian jazz musician
 Rude, a member of the fictional "Turks" in the video game Final Fantasy VII and the film Final Fantasy VII: Advent Children; see Characters of the Final Fantasy VII series#Rude 
 Mr. Rude, a Mr. Men character; see List of Mr. Men#Mr. Rude
 Rude Records, an independent record label
 "Rude" (song), a song by the Canadian group Magic!
 Rude (film), a 1995 Canadian film by Clément Virgo
 NOAAS Rude (S 590), originally USC&GS Rude, a survey ship in service in the United States Coast and Geodetic Survey from 1967 to 1970 and in the National Oceanic and Atmospheric Administration from 1970 to 2008
 Rude, Croatia, a village near Samobor
 Rüde, a village and a former municipality in Schleswig-Holstein, Germany